The Keith and Paddy Picture Show is a British comedy parody series, written by and starring Leigh Francis (as Keith Lemon) and Paddy McGuinness, first broadcast on ITV on 6 May 2017. The series is billed as a "comedic tribute" to some of Lemon and McGuinness' favourite films. Each week they attempt to recreate an iconic film, with the help of a celebrity cast.

Production
The series originated as the result of a semi-regular sketch featured in The Keith Lemon Sketch Show, known as Keith & Paddy's Film Bit, and non-broadcast pilot entitled The Keith and Paddy Show, which was recorded in 2016 and featured a number of celebrity guests and film parody sketches. The series was first announced on 24 November 2016, when ITV announced the commission of a five-episode series, featuring parodies of the films Dirty Dancing, Ghostbusters, Star Wars: Return of the Jedi, Jaws and Rocky. The first series began transmission on 6 May 2017 at 9:15pm.

The first series drew a strong viewing audience for the timeslot. As a result, a second series, extended to six episodes, was confirmed on 11 January 2018. Parodies in this series include Grease, Top Gun, Pretty Woman, Terminator 2: Judgment Day and Jurassic Park. Series two, began broadcasting on 14 April 2018. Five episodes were broadcast over April and May, with the remaining episode, a parody of Gremlins, being broadcast as a Christmas Special on Christmas Eve 2018.

Episodes

Transmissions

Series 1 (2017)

Series 2 (2018)

References

External links
	

2017 British television series debuts
2018 British television series endings
2010s British comedy television series
ITV sketch shows
Television series by Fremantle (company)
English-language television shows
Television shows set in England
Television shows set in London
Television shows shot at Elstree Film Studios